Samuel J. McAllister (1903 – November 5, 1975) was an American college basketball, baseball and football coach.

Early life and education
McAllister attended St. Viator College in Bourbonnais, Illinois, where he was standout athlete for the St. Viator Irish football, basketball and baseball teams.

Coaching career
McAllister graduated from St. Viator in 1926, and was elected the "head coach of athletics" immediately thereafter.  He coached the St. Viator football, basketball and baseball teams from 1926 to 1930, and compiled win–loss records of 46–14 in baseball and 51–19 in basketball in four seasons.

In December 1930, McAllister was hired to be the head coach of the Auburn Tigers men's basketball and the Auburn Tigers baseball teams of Alabama Polytechnic Institute in Auburn, Alabama, positions he held from 1930 to 1933.  He compiled an overall win–loss record of 25–18 as the Tigers' basketball coach; the Tigers' baseball records for 1931–1933 are incomplete.

McAllister later served as the head coach of the Florida Gators men's basketball team of the University of Florida in Gainesville, Florida, from 1937 to 1942 and again from 1946 to 1951, leading the Gators to an overall record of 119–96 in ten seasons.  McAllister was also the head coach of the Florida Gators baseball team from 1940 to 1942 and from 1946 to 1947, and compiled an overall record of 40–56–4 in five seasons.  During his stints as the head coach of the Gators' basketball and baseball teams, he also served as the line coach and assistant for the Florida Gators football team under head coaches Josh Cody, Tom Lieb and Raymond Wolf from 1938 to 1942, and again from 1946 to 1950, while doubling as the head coach of the Gators' freshman football team known as the "Omelette Squad."

Late life and death
McAllister died on November 5, 1975, at the age of 72.

Head coaching record

Football

Basketball

Notes

References

Bibliography
 McCarthy, Kevin M., Baseball in Florida, Pineapple Press, Inc., Sarasota, Florida (1996).  .

External links
 

1903 births
1975 deaths
American football tackles
Auburn Tigers baseball coaches
Auburn Tigers men's basketball coaches
Baseball pitchers
Florida Gators baseball coaches
Florida Gators football coaches
Florida Gators men's basketball coaches
Guards (basketball)
St. Viator Irish baseball coaches
St. Viator Irish baseball players
St. Viator Irish basketball coaches
St. Viator Irish basketball players
St. Viator Irish football coaches
St. Viator Irish football players